Matt "Luca" Devoti (born 1963) is an Italian competitive sailor and Olympic medalist. He won a silver medal in the Finn class at the 2000 Summer Olympics in Sydney.

He is also builder of Devoti Snipes. He was involved with +39 Challenge in the 2007 Louis Vuitton Cup.

References

1963 births
Living people
Sportspeople from Verona
Italian male sailors (sport)
Olympic sailors of Italy
Olympic silver medalists for Italy
Olympic medalists in sailing
Sailors at the 1996 Summer Olympics – Finn
Sailors at the 2000 Summer Olympics – Finn
Snipe (dinghy)
2007 America's Cup sailors
Medalists at the 2000 Summer Olympics